Myriam Loriol-Oberwiler (born 19 November 1962 in Zurich) is a Swiss former competitive figure skater. Appearing as Myriam Oberwiler in ladies' singles, she became a two-time Swiss national champion (1982 and 1984) and finished 14th at the 1984 Winter Olympics.

Working in Neuchâtel, Loriol-Oberwiler coached Stéphane Walker (? – 2015) and Nicola Todeschini (? – spring 2013). She retired from coaching by the end of 2015. She has also worked as an International Skating Union technical specialist.

Competitive highlights

References

Swiss female single skaters
1962 births
Olympic figure skaters of Switzerland
Figure skaters at the 1984 Winter Olympics
Living people
Figure skaters from Zürich